Thieves on Strike (German:Der Streik der Diebe) is a 1921 German silent film directed by Alfred Abel.

Cast
In alphabetical order
 Alfred Abel as Will Fair  
 Charlotte Ander 
 Victor Colani 
 Hans Kuhnert 
 Maria Orska 
 Albert Steinrück

References

Bibliography
 Hans-Michael Bock and Tim Bergfelder. The Concise Cinegraph: An Encyclopedia of German Cinema. Berghahn Books.

External links

1921 films
Films of the Weimar Republic
Films directed by Alfred Abel
German silent feature films
German black-and-white films